The 12th Asia Pacific Screen Awards were held on 29 November 2018 in Brisbane, Australia.

Winners and nominees

Nominees and winners were:

References 

Asia Pacific Screen Awards
Asia Pacific Screen Awards
Asia Pacific Screen Awards
Asia Pacific Screen Awards